Students for Fair Admissions (SFFA) is an organization headed by Edward Blum that has represented, and filed lawsuits on behalf of, over 20,000 students and their parents who allege that the students have been rejected by selective universities due to their race. SFFA has been described by its opponents as an anti-affirmative action group that objects to the use of race as one of the factors in college admissions.

Lawsuits 
SFFA is an offshoot of the Project on Fair Representation. Its lawsuits have targeted Harvard University, the University of North Carolina at Chapel Hill, and the University of Wisconsin at Madison. Blum set up websites called harvardnotfair.org, uncnotfair.org, and uwnotfair.org to attract plaintiffs. SFFA filed federal lawsuits against Harvard and UNC-Chapel Hill in November 2014, but has not yet sued UW-Madison. 

Unlike the Fisher case, in which the plaintiff, Abigail Fisher, made herself public, the students rejected by Harvard and UNC have not revealed their identities because they want to shield themselves from potential retaliation. 

Students for Fair Admissions v. President and Fellows of Harvard College was dismissed in October 2019, and that ruling was subsequently upheld on appeal. In February 2021, however, SFFA petitioned the Supreme Court of the United States to review the case.

In February 2021, SFFA sued Yale University, alleging that its admissions policies discriminate against Asian-American and white applicants.

See also 
 Fisher v. University of Texas II (2016)

References 

Affirmative action
Majority–minority relations
Race and law
University and college admissions